Brother's keeper may refer to:

"Brother's keeper", a Biblical phrase from William Tyndale's translation of the story of Cain and Abel

Film 

 Brother's Keeper (1992 film), an American documentary film
 Brother's Keeper (2002 film), an American television film directed by John Badham
 Brother's Keeper, a 2013 film featuring Michael Rooker
 Brother's Keeper (2014 film), a Nigerian film directed by Ikechukwu Onyeka
 Brother's Keeper (2021 film), an American film starring Laurence Fishburne

Music 

 Brother's Keeper (band), an American punk rock band
 Brother's Keeper, a band appearing on the compilation album Surfonic Water Revival
 Brother's Keeper (Neville Brothers album), 1990
 Brother's Keeper (Rich Mullins album), 1995
 "Brother's Keeper", a song by Anderson Paak from Oxnard
 "Brother's Keeper", a song by Basement from Promise Everything
 "Brother's Keeper", a song by DaBaby from My Brother's Keeper (Long Live G)
 "Brother's Keeper", a song by Firewind from Burning Earth

Television

Series 

 Brother's Keeper (1998 TV series), an American sitcom
 Brother's Keeper (2013 TV series), a Hong Kong television drama

Episodes 

 "Brother's Keeper" (The Crow: Stairway to Heaven)
 "Brother's Keeper" (Dr. Quinn, Medicine Woman)
 "Brother's Keeper" (Fear the Walking Dead)
 "Brother's Keeper" (Heroes)
 "Brother's Keeper" (The Invisible Man)
 "Brother's Keeper" (Justified)
 "Brother's Keeper" (Knight Rider)
 "Brother's Keeper" (Law & Order)
 "Brother's Keeper" (Law & Order: Criminal Intent)
 "Brother's Keeper" (Miami Vice)
 "Brother's Keeper" (Mutant X)
 "Brother's Keeper" (The Nine)
 "Brother's Keeper" (Party of Five)
 "Brother's Keeper" (Prison Break)
 "Brother's Keeper" (Tru Calling)
 "Brother's Keeper" (Supernatural)

Other uses 

 Brother's Keeper (software), a line of genealogy software
 "Brother's Keeper", a 2003 episode of the radio series This American Life
 Brothers Keepers, a German-based anti-racism project
 Operation Brother's Keeper, an Israeli Defense Forces operation in response to the 2014 kidnapping of Israeli teens

See also 
 Brothers and Keepers, a 1984 memoir by John Edgar Wideman
 My Brother's Keeper (disambiguation)
 Her Brother's Keeper (disambiguation)
 His Brother's Keeper (disambiguation)